Redneck Fiddlin' Man is an album by American musician Charlie Daniels. It was released on July 23, 2002 and peaked at number 40 on the Top Country Albums chart.

Track listing
 "Rock This Joint"
 "Waco"
 "Little Joe and Big Bill"
 "Last Fallen Hero"
 "Southern Boy" (with Travis Tritt)
 "High Speed Heroes"
 "Fais Do Do"
 "Muddy Mississippi"
 "Redneck Fiddlin' Man"
 "Crosstown Traffic" (instrumental)
 "My Baby Plays Me Just Like a Fiddle"
 "The Star-Spangled Banner" (instrumental)

Critical reception
Redneck Fiddlin' Man received three stars out of five from Robert L. Doerschuk of Allmusic. He concludes that "No surprises here -- but the Charlie Daniels Band is never about surprise. As with most artists who define themselves according to established musical traditions, their goal is to conform to audience expectations. Daniels isn't the most nuanced singer out there, nor the smoothest fiddler -- but within the confines of the style, which means the span from squint-eyed menace to keg-popping jocularity, no one matches his vocal expressiveness."

Chart performance

Album
Redneck Fiddlin' Man peaked at number 40 on the Top Country Albums chart and at number 44 on the Top Independent Albums chart.

Singles

Personnel
Charlie Daniels - Fiddle, mandolin, viola, vocals, background vocals
Joel "Taz" DiGregorio - Keyboards, Hammond organ, vocals
Charlie Hayward - Electric bass
Pat McDonald - Drums, percussion
Garth Brooks - Background vocals
Bruce Brown - Acoustic guitar, electric guitar, background vocals
Mark Matejka - Acoustic guitar, electric guitar, background vocals

References

2002 albums
Charlie Daniels albums
E1 Music albums